The 1905–06 West Virginia Mountaineers men's basketball team represents the University of West Virginia during the 1905–06 college men's basketball season. The team captain was Shelby Taylor.

Schedule

|-

References

West Virginia Mountaineers men's basketball seasons
West Virginia
West Virginia Mountaineers men's b
West Virginia Mountaineers men's b